Mario Forsythe (born 30 October 1985) is a Jamaican sprinter who specialises in the 100 and 200 metres. He ran a 9.95 in Rieti, Italy, in August 2010, becoming the 74th runner to break the 10-second barrier.

Personal best

References

External links

1985 births
Living people
Jamaican male sprinters